Shock:Social Science Fiction is a pen-and-paper indie RPG about the effects of the shock of cultural change on the individuals who make up that culture. The title is a reference to Alvin Toffler's Future Shock, the concept that rapid culture changes leave the members of the culture increasingly challenged by adaptation.

It was first published in 2006 and has since been through two point version updates.

Notable Features 
The game is designed to be used by players to make "what if" science fiction, rather than science-flavored fantasy adventure.   The science fiction elements (called "Shocks" in the text) deeply impact the world of the game-created fiction and are inextricable from the story. 

Reviewer Jono Xia wrote,

... Because a game of Shock is built around real-world issues that you care about, your game is going to be a little deeper than just entertainment -- it's going to be a story that's about something. It's going to have some intellectual heft to it. It's going to get you thinking. For this reason, I think that playing Shock can actually be therapeutic: when you're feeling confused about some topic in the news, if you can't decide how you feel about some pressing social issue, if you see a new invention and wonder what it might mean, you can play a Shock game about it. Role-playing it out might help you and your friends work through your thoughts and explore possible consequences. In Shock, I think we might finally have an RPG that does what the best written SF does -- help us learn to cope with the rapid social and technological changes occurring in the modern world. 

The game originated a system of counterstakes, called "intents" that raises the possibility of every player getting what they asked for, a process with deliberately ironic results.

Editions 
 1st Edition (Version 1.0) was published in 2006. The original edition was poorly edited and difficult to follow.
 2nd Edition (Version 1.1) was published in 2007, fixing some typos in the text and adding some clarifications to improve playability. 
 3rd Edition (Version 1.2) was published in 2009 again fixing some typos and adding an outline of the process of setup and play.

Linguistic Peculiarities 

The game text makes use of the invented gender neutral pronoun zie and the possessive hir to allow the player to experience some of the same culture shock that the characters in the game will live through.

Furthermore, when the rules refer generically to a Protagonist or Antagonist the text uses *Tagonist as a generic alternative (borrowing the unix-style wildcard character *).

Mechanics 
Unlike most other pen-and-paper role-playing games, Shock: does not require advance preparation by a moderator or game facilitator.  The game has no traditional Game Master role: each player creates a Protagonist (that will be her/his character) and gives the player to his/her left a guideline about the kind of Antagonist they will face. That player then fleshes out the Antagonists sheet.

Play goes around the table with each Protagonist playing out a scene until the Antagonist places them in a conflict situation. Then the conflict is resolved, the scene ends, and play continues with a new scene with the next player's Protagonist.

References

External links 
 Shock: Home Page
 The indie rpg unstore page for Shock:

Indie role-playing games
Science fiction role-playing games
Role-playing games introduced in 2006